Sapawe or Sepawe is a Tewa Pueblo ancestral site in an address-restricted area near El Rito, New Mexico. It was occupied from around 1350 until around 1550.

References

Archaeological sites in New Mexico
Former populated places in New Mexico
History of Rio Arriba County, New Mexico
Native American history of New Mexico
Ruins in the United States
Protected areas of Rio Arriba County, New Mexico
Pueblo great houses
Puebloan buildings and structures
Tewa
Pueblos in New Mexico